Barrona County is one of the 141 Cadastral divisions of New South Wales. It is bounded by the Warrego River in the east and the Paroo River in the west.

Barrona is believed to be derived from a local Aboriginal word and the nearby Barrona Downs also carries that Aboriginal name.

Parishes within this county
A full list of parishes found within this county; their current LGA and mapping coordinates to the approximate centre of each location is as follows:

References

Counties of New South Wales